Pseudopedinella is a heterokont genus found in brackish waters. It includes the species Pseudopedinella elastica.

References

Heterokont genera
Dictyochophyceae